Vegan Reich was an American hardcore punk band from Laguna Beach, California, United States, active from 1987 to 1999. Fronted by singer-songwriter Sean Muttaqi, the band was formerly identified with the controversial hardline subculture, a more militant tendency of the vegan straight edge movement.

Along with Raid, Vegan Reich were one of the most well-known bands to identify with hardline. Vegan Reich created the founding statement for the movement, in which they write of their attempted break with the straight edge and hardcore scenes.

Members 
 Sean Muttaqi – lead vocals, guitars, bass (1987–92;1999)
 Andy Hurley – drums, percussion (1999)
 Jon Ewing – drums (1988–1991)
 Aaron S. – drums (1987)
 Sergio Hernandez – bass (1989–1990)
 Dom Ehling – bass (1990–1992)
 Ray Titus – drums, percussion (1991–1992)

Discography 
 1987: Stop Talking – Start Revenging" (track on ALF compilation LP)
 1990: Hardline (EP)
 1992: The Wrath Of God 1995: Vanguard (Best of)
 1999: Jihad'' (EP)

See also 
Animal rights and punk subculture

References

External links
Discogs page
Interview with Vegan Reich's Sean Muttaqi

Crossover thrash groups
Hardcore punk groups from California
Musical groups established in 1988
Straight edge groups
Thrash metal musical groups from California
Environmental musical artists